The Theatre Olympics is a non-profit organisation that promotes theatrical exchange where dialogue between different theatremakers, irrespective of ideological, culture and language differences is encouraged. The primary output of the organisation is an international multicultural, multidisciplinary theatre festival (also called the Theatre Olympics), which aims to embrace different theatre traditions, respect diverse cultures and encourage intercultural networking among theatre artists around the world. The Theatre Olympics are held infrequently and in various locations around the globe. Each festival is organised around a broad theme.

Established in 1994 by an international committee led by Greek theatre director, Theodoros Terzopoulos, The Theatre Olympics originally had the subtitle "Crossing Millennia" to reflect the importance the organisation placed on connecting the past, present, and future of human cultural endeavours and to reflect the festival's aim to re-establish the importance of theatre in the cultural life of the twenty-first century. Despite the name, there are no competitive elements or prizes awarded at the Theatre Olympics.

The organisation's administrative headquarters are located in Athens, Greece (European office) and in Toga, Toyama, Japan (Asian office). The Theatre Olympics logo is used for every festival and was designed by the American theatre director, Robert Wilson.

The Committee 

The first official meeting of the International Committee of Theatre Olympics took place on 18 June 1994 in Delphi, Greece, however discussions between the members had been ongoing since 1989. The founding committee was a group of eight internationally renowned theatre directors: Theodoros Terzopoulos, Nuria Espert, Antunes Filho, Tony Harrison, Yuri Lyubimov, Heiner Müller, Tadashi Suzuki and Robert Wilson. The International Committee of Theatre Olympics meets once a year. New members can join after being recommended by one of the existing members and being approved by two-thirds of the committee.

Currently the International Committee of Theatre Olympics consists of fifteen members:

Theodoros Terzopoulos (Greece) – chairman
Giorgio Barberio Corsetti (Italy)
Choi Chyrim (South Korea)
Nuria Espert (Spain)
Antunes Filho (Brazil)
Jurgen Flimm (Germany)
Valery Fokin (Russia)
Jarosław Fret (Poland)
Tony Harrison (United Kingdom)
Georges Lavaudant (France)
Liu Lubin (China)
Wole Soyinka (Nigeria)
Tadashi Suzuki (Japan)
Ratan Thiyam (India)
Robert Wilson (United States)

Former founding members of the Theatre Olympics:

Yuri Lyubimov (1995–2014) (Russia)
Heiner Müller (1995–1995) (Germany)

Hosting Countries 

The Theatre Olympics are held in a different country each edition. So far there have been nine festivals. The festival allows the host country to reflect their own theatre heritage and the event is reinvented each time by a new artistic director – who is usually an International Committee member of the Theatre Olympics. The festival's national organising committee usually consists of prominent representatives of the country's cultural life.

The hosting cities have been:

References

Further reading 

 Kim, Jae Kyoung (2016).  International Theatre Olympics: The Artistic and Intercultural Power of Olympism. London: Palgrave. .

External links 

 The official Japanese site for the 2019 festival
 The official Russian website for the 2019 festival
 New York Times article that covers a brief history of the Theatre Olympics

Theatre festivals
Recurring events established in 1995